Dilys Rose is a Scottish fiction writer and poet. Born in 1954 in Glasgow, Rose studied at Edinburgh University, where she taught creative writing from 2002 until 2017. She was Director of the MSc in Creative Writing by Online Learning from 2012 to 2017. She is currently a Royal Literary Fellow at the University of Glasgow. Her third  novel Unspeakable was  published by Freight Books in 2017.

Awards and honours
Rose has won many awards, including the Canongate Prize, the Macallan/Scotland on Sunday Short Story Competition, and a Robert Louis Stevenson Memorial Award; she has also been awarded a Society of Authors travel bursary and a UNESCO City of Literature exchange fellowship. Her poem 'Sailmaker's Palm' won the 2006 McCash Poetry Prize, and her poetry collection Bodywork was shortlisted for the Sundial Scottish Arts Council Book Award. Rose's novel Red Tides won the 1993 Scottish Arts Council Book Award, as well as being shortlisted for the Saltire Society Scottish Book of the Year Award and the McVitie's Prize for Scottish Writer of the Year.

Selected works

Poetry
 Madame Doubtfire's Dilemma, Chapman, 1989
 When I Wear My Leopard Hat: Poems for Young Children (illustrated by Gill Allan), Scottish Children's Press, 1997
 Lure, Chapman, 2003
 Bodywork, Luath, 2007
 Stone the Crows, Mariscat, 2020

Fiction
 Our Lady of the Pickpockets, Secker & Warburg, 1989
 Red Tides, Secker & Warburg, 1993
 War Dolls, Headline Review, 1998
 Pest Maiden, Headline Review, 1999 - 
 Lord of Illusions, Luath Press, 2005 - "proves adept at swiftly establishing a mood"
 Selected Stories, Luath Press, 2005
 Pelmanism, Luath Press, 2014
 Unspeakable, Freight Books, 2017
 Sea Fret, Scotland Street Press, 2022

Short stories 
 Sea Fret, Scotland Street Press, 2022

References

1954 births
Living people
Scottish short story writers
Scottish women novelists
Scottish women poets
20th-century British novelists
British women short story writers
20th-century British women writers
20th-century British short story writers
Alumni of the University of Edinburgh